Adam Michael Rodriguez (born April 2, 1975) is an American actor, screenwriter and director. He became known for his role as Eric Delko on CSI: Miami. He portrayed Task Force Agent Luke Alvez in Criminal Minds.

Early life
Rodriguez was born in Yonkers, New York, the son of Janet, an airline ticket agent, and Ramon Rodriguez, an executive with the United States Hispanic Chamber of Commerce.

His father is of half Puerto Rican and half Cuban descent, and his mother is of Puerto Rican ancestry.

He attended Clarkstown High School North in New City, New York, graduating in 1993. Rodriguez initially hoped to be a professional baseball player, but after a high school injury, he turned his attention to acting and performed in a children's theater in New York. 

Before full-time acting, he was a stockbroker.

Career

Rodriguez has appeared in commercials, including one for Coca-Cola. His first film appearance was as an extra in The X-Files. He later appeared on Brooklyn South, Law & Order, Felicity, Roswell, and NYPD Blue.

He appeared in a number of music videos, including Jennifer Lopez's 1999 video "If You Had My Love"; Busta Rhymes' "Respect My Conglomerate"; Lionel Richie's "I Call It Love"; Melanie Fiona's "It Kills Me"; 50 Cent's "Many Men"; and Wisin & Yandel's "No Dejemos Que Se Apague". He was a participant in the pro-Barack Obama video "Yes We Can".

He starred in 18 episodes of Roswell (Season 3)

He was part of the original cast of CSI: Miami, which premiered in 2002. He  later directed and wrote the episode "Hunting Ground" (season 9, episode 16). He left the main cast five episodes into season 8 and was credited as a recurring cast member for eight episodes. He returned to the main cast in season 9 and remained on the show until it ended with season 10 in 2012.

Rodriguez starred in the 2009 Tyler Perry movie I Can Do Bad All By Myself as Sandino. He co-starred in a smaller film, Love and Debate. He played Bobby, Hilda's love interest, in season 4 of Ugly Betty. 

He appeared in Let the Game Begin (2010), Magic Mike (2012) and “Magic Mike XXL (2015) 

In 2015, he was cast in the recurring role of Dr. Chavez in the second season of The Night Shift.

Rodriguez was on the cover of H mag on April 2012, photographed by Joey Shaw. .

In 2016, Rodriguez was cast as Luke Alvez, an FBI Fugitive Task Force Agent who joins the Behavioral Analysis Unit in season 12 of Criminal Minds, replacing Shemar Moore.

In 2021, Rodriguez was cast as Bobby Diaz in a recurring role in NBC drama series Ordinary Joe.

Personal life 
Rodriguez splits his time between New York City and Los Angeles, and he has a third residence in Puerto Rico.

Rodriguez married model Grace Gail in 2016. They have three children, including son Bridgemont Bernard Rodriguez who was born on March 16, 2020.

Filmography

Film

Television

Director

Writer

Music videos

Awards and nominations

References

External links
  Adam Rodriguez profile, cbs.com; accessed March 17, 2016.
 

1975 births
Living people
Male actors from New York (state)
American male film actors
American people of Cuban descent
American people of Puerto Rican descent
American male television actors
American male voice actors
Hispanic and Latino American male actors
People from Yonkers, New York
20th-century American male actors
21st-century American male actors